Osmond Charles Cleal (13 December 1916 – 8 February 1977) was an association football player who represented New Zealand at international level. He also played first-class cricket for Auckland from 1940 to 1952.

Football career
Cleal made three appearances in official internationals for the New Zealand, the first a 0–10 loss to Australia on 11 July 1936, a result which still stands as New Zealand's biggest loss in official matches, although New Zealand have been beaten by more in unofficial matches, notably by England Amateurs in 1937 and Manchester United in 1967.

War interrupted his playing career. New Zealand competed in no further official matches until South Africa toured in 1947, when Cleal played two further matches, a 5–6 loss on 28 June and a 0–6 loss on 5 July.

Cricket career
Ossie Cleal made his first-class debut in the 1940–41 season, scoring 58 and 98 in the middle order in two easy victories for Auckland. After serving as a sergeant and acting second lieutenant with the Second New Zealand Expeditionary Force in the Pacific, he resumed his career in the 1944–45 season. In three matches for Auckland he scored 30, 77 not out, 24, 58, 96 and 74 not out. At this stage of his career he had made 515 runs at an average of 84.37. However, when he was selected for North Island against South Island at the end of the season he made only 4 and 0.

After a few lean seasons he returned to form in 1949–50 when in four matches he made 344 runs at 43.00, including 45 and 45 (top score in each innings) for Auckland against the Australians. It was also his most successful season with his medium-pace: he took eight wickets at 20.87.

He captained Auckland in 1950–51 and 1951–52. He was selected to play in the First Test against England in 1950–51 but had to withdraw from the team and was replaced by Tony MacGibbon. He retired after the 1951–52 season.

He worked as a warehouseman.

See also
 List of Auckland representative cricketers

References

External links
 Ossie Cleal at CricketArchive
 Osmond Charles Cleal record at Online Cenotaph

1916 births
1977 deaths
New Zealand association footballers
New Zealand international footballers
New Zealand cricketers
Auckland cricketers
Association footballers not categorized by position
New Zealand military personnel of World War II
New Zealand Army officers
North Island cricketers
Association footballers from Auckland